Netshell may refer to:

Netsh
NetShell